Ealdwulf is a male given name used by:

 Ealdwulf of East Anglia, King of the East Angles
 Ealdwulf of Sussex King of Sussex in the early 8th century
 Aldwulf of Rochester Bishop of Rochester from 727 to 736
 Ealdwulf of Lindsey Bishop of Lindsey from 750 to 796
 Ealdwulf of Lichfield Bishop of Lichfield in the early 9th century
 Ealdwulf (archbishop of York) Archbishop of York from 995–1002

See also
 Eadwulf
Eardwulf

English masculine given names
Germanic masculine given names